The 1955–56 Tunisian National Championship was the 30th season of top-tier football in Tunisia. It saw CS Hammam-Lif crowned as champions while Patriote de Sousse was relegated to Ligue 2.

Participating Clubs 
CS Hammam-Lif (CSHL)
Étoile du Sahel (ESS)
Club Africain (CA)
Espérance de Tunis (EST)
CA Bizertin (CAB)
USM Ferryville (USMF)
Stade Tunisien (ST)
Club Tunisien (CT)
Sfax Railways Sports (SRS)
Olympique Tunisien (OT)
Patriote Football Club de Bizerte (PFCB)
Patriote de Sousse (PS)

Results

League table

Result table

Top scorers 
25 goals :
Habib Mougou (Étoile du Sahel)
13 goals :
Boubaker Haddad (CA Bizertin)
Mounir Kbaili (Club Africain)
11 goals :
Hédi Braiek (Stade Tunisien)
Norbert Michel (USM de Ferryville)
10 goals :
Tijani Essafi (Club Tunisien)
Amédée Scorsone (Olympique Tunisien)
Chedly Bouzid (CA Bizertin)
Noureddine Diwa (Stade Tunisien)

Champion 
Club Sportif de Hammam-Lif (CSHL)
 Formation : Abdesselem, Zouari, Hammouda, Mustapha, Chiarenza, Laaribi, Trabelsi, Azzouz, Saad Karmous, Abdelkader, M. Hénia, Abdelhafidh, Laafif, Ben Jeddou, Ben Smail
 Coach : G. Berry

Movements 
Relegated : Patriote de Sousse
Promoted : Jeunesse Sportive Methouienne

Notes and references

External links
1955–56 Ligue 1 on RSSSF.com

1955–56 in African association football leagues
1955–56
1955 in African football
1956 in African football
1